Cal Jennings (born May 17, 1997) is an American professional soccer player who plays as a forward who currently plays for Tampa Bay Rowdies in the USL Championship.

Early life and college
Born in Atlanta, Georgia, Jennings attended Roswell High School where he played two seasons for the school's soccer team. He also spent a season with U.S. Soccer Development Academy club Georgia United.

After graduating high school, Jennings enrolled at the University of Central Florida and joined the UCF Knights college soccer team. He made his debut on August 26, 2016 against the Grand Canyon Antelopes. He scored his first and only goal of his freshman season on October 8 against the Memphis Tigers in a 2–3 defeat. During the 2017 season, Jennings scored 7 goals in 16 matches. The next season, Jennings had a breakout season, scoring 20 goals and starting all 18 matches for the Knights. He ended the season tied as the NCAA Division I top-scorer.

During his final season with the Knights, Jennings scored 18 goals in 20 matches, earning several individual accolades. He was named a semifinalist for the Hermann Trophy for the 2019 season.

Club career

Memphis 901
On January 9, 2020, Jennings was selected with the 17th overall pick by FC Dallas in the 2020 MLS SuperDraft. However, in late February, he was released from the club's pre-season camp without earning a first-team contract. A few months later, on July 13, Jennings joined USL Championship club Memphis 901.

Jennings made his professional debut for Memphis 901 on July 15, coming on as a 62nd minute substitute during a 3–0 defeat against Birmingham Legion. He then scored his first goal for the club on July 18 against Atlanta United 2 during a 2–2 draw.

Jennings ended his first season scoring a hat-trick on October 3 against Birmingham Legion. His three goals helped the club to a 3–1 victory. This was part of a scoring run in which Jennings scored in four games in a row, netting eight goals.

Los Angeles FC
On December 4, 2020, Jennings joined USL Championship club Indy Eleven for the 2021 season. However, on March 9, 2021, it was announced that Jennings had signed with Major League Soccer club Los Angeles FC without playing a game for Indy Eleven. To make the signing, Los Angeles FC traded their natural third-round selection in the 2022 MLS SuperDraft for Jennings' college rights from FC Dallas. Following the 2022 season, Jennings was released by LAFC.

Tampa Bay Rowdies
On January 26, 2023, Jennings signed with USL Championship side Tampa Bay Rowdies.

Career statistics

Honors
Los Angeles FC
MLS Cup : 2022
Supporters' Shield: 2022

individual
 AAC Offensive player of the year: 2018, 2019
 NSCAA First-team All-American: 2018, 2019
 NCAA Top goalscorer: 2019

References

External links
Profile at the Major League Soccer website

1997 births
Living people
People from Roswell, Georgia
Sportspeople from Fulton County, Georgia
American soccer players
Association football forwards
All-American men's college soccer players
UCF Knights men's soccer players
FC Dallas draft picks
Memphis 901 FC players
Indy Eleven players
Los Angeles FC players
USL Championship players
Soccer players from Georgia (U.S. state)
Las Vegas Lights FC players
Major League Soccer players
Tampa Bay Rowdies players